Mooroopna railway station is located on the Tocumwal line in Victoria, Australia. It serves the town of Mooroopna, and it opened on 13 January 1880.

A siding for the SPC Ardmona fruit factory is located opposite the station, and is served by Pacific National freight services. All sidings at the station, with the exception of the siding serving SPC Ardmona, were abolished in 1991.

On 13 January 2018, a suspicious fire destroyed the station building in the early hours of the morning.

As part of the Regional Rail Revival project to upgrade the Shepparton line, the platform was extended to accommodate VLocity trains. The project was completed by August 2022, and included new lighting, seating, shelter and CCTV, as well an upgraded car park and upgraded paths leading to the station.

Demolished station Toolamba was located between Mooroopna and Murchison East.

Platforms and services

Mooroopna has one platform. It is serviced by V/Line Shepparton line services.

Platform 1:
 services to Shepparton and Southern Cross

References

External links

Victorian Railway Stations gallery

Railway stations in Australia opened in 1880
Regional railway stations in Victoria (Australia)